George Perrins (24 February 1873 – after 1896) was an English footballer. His regular position was at half back. He was born in Birmingham. He played for Birmingham St George's, Newton Heath and Luton Town.

References

1873 births
Footballers from Birmingham, West Midlands
English footballers
Association football midfielders
Birmingham St George's F.C. players
Manchester United F.C. players
Luton Town F.C. players
English Football League players
Year of death missing